Rantau is a state constituency in Negeri Sembilan, Malaysia, that has been represented in the Negeri Sembilan State Legislative Assembly.

The state constituency was first contested in 1959 and is mandated to return a single Assemblyman to the Negeri Sembilan State Legislative Assembly under the first-past-the-post voting system. , the State Assemblyman for Rantau is Mohamad Hasan from the Barisan Nasional (BN). In the 2018 elections, Mohamad Hasan won the seat uncontested. However, the Election Court has on the 16 November 2018, passed a ruling that Mohamad Hasan had not been duly elected. A fresh elections was called to be held after Mohamad Hasan's appeal was dismissed by the Federal Court on 18 February 2019.

Demographics

Representation history

Election results
The electoral results for the Rantau state constituency in 2008, 2013 and 2018 are as follows.

References

Negeri Sembilan state constituencies